The MTV Russia Music Awards made its debut in 2004 and have celebrated local Russian talent as well as International. The MTV Russia Music Awards (RMA) features local and international acts and music celebrities being honoured by Russian viewers.

Host cities

2004

Award winners

 Video of the Year: Zveri - "Vsye, chto kasaetsya"
 Best Female Act: Valeriya - "Chasiki"
 Best Male Act: Dolphin - "Vesna"
 Best Group: Zveri - "Vsye, chto kasaetsya"
 Breakthrough of the Year: Uma2rman - "Praskovya"
 Best Song: VIA GRA feat. V.Meladze - "Prityazhenya bolshe net"
 Best International Act: The Rasmus - "In the Shadows"
 Best Pop Act: Smash!! - "Freeway"
 Best Rock Act: Kipelov - "Ya svoboden"
 Best Hip Hop/Rap Act: Kasta - "Revnost"
 Best Dance Act: Nike Borzov feat. Gosti iz budushchego - "Malenkaya loshadka"
 Artist of the Year: Zveri - "Vsye, chto kasaetsya"
 Free Your Mind: Vladimir Posner
 Stay Alive: 1st detachment of the Republican clinical hospital

Performances
 Queen & Zemfira
 The Rasmus
 Darren Hayes
 Zveri
 Leningrad
 VIA GRA feat. V.Meladze
 Valeriya

2005

Award winners

 Video of the Year: Zemfira - "Blues"
 Best Female Act: Zhasmin - "Oh, How I Need You"
 Best Male Act: Dima Bilan - "On The Heaven’s Shore"
 Best Group: Diskoteka Avariya - "If You Want To Stay"
 Breakthrough of the Year: Masskva - "SMS Love"
 Best Song: Valeriya / Stas Piekha - "So Sad You Are"
 Best International Act: The Black Eyed Peas - "Don't Phunk with My Heart"
 Best Pop Act: Korni - "Happy New Year, Folks"
 Best Rock Act: Zveri - "Strong Booze"
 Best Rap Act: Seryoga - "King Ring"
 Best Dance Act: Vengerov & Fedoroff - "Gentlemen of Luck"
 Best Ringtone: Seryoga - "King Ring"
 Artist of the Year: Dima Bilan
 Free Your Mind: Valery Gazzaev
 Stay Alive: Alexandera Volgina
 MTV Opening FPS

Performances
 Korn
 The 69 Eyes
 Kelly Osbourne
 Dima Bilan
 Seryoga
 Zemlyane & Zveri
 Korni
 Vlad Topalov

2006

Award winners

 Video of the Year: t.A.T.u. – All About Us
 Best Female Act: Yulia Savicheva
 Best Male Act: Sergey Lazarev
 Best Group: Zveri
 Breakthrough of the Year: Gorod 312
 Best Song: Dima Bilan – "Never Let You Go"
 Best International Act: The Black Eyed Peas
 Best Pop Act: VIA Gra
 Best Rock Act: Tokio
 Best Rap Act: Ligalize - "Budushie mamy"
 Best Ringtone: A'Studio – "Uletayu"
 Artist of the Year: Dima Bilan
 Free Your Mind: Crew of the sailfish Kruzenshtern
 Stay Alive: Vlad Topalov

Performances
 Missy Elliott
 Dolphin
 Yulia Savicheva
 Ligalize
 Dima Bilan
 VIA GRA
 BAND`EROS
 Tokio
 Gorod 312

2007

Award winners

 Video of the Year: Splean - "Skazhi, chto ya eyo lyublyu"
 Best Female Act: MakSim
 Best Male Act: Dima Bilan
 Best Group: A'Studio
 Breakthrough of the Year: Serebro
 Best Song: Dima Bilan – Nevozmozhnoye vozmozhno/Lady Flame
 Best International Act: Avril Lavigne
 Best Pop Act: MakSim
 Best Rock Act: Bi-2
 Best Rap Act: Byanka
 Artist of the Year: Dima Bilan
 Stay Alive: Chulpan Khamatova's fund "Present Life"
 MTV Opening Alexey Vorobyov

Performances
 Avril Lavigne
 Dima Bilan & Sebastian
 Boykot & Turbo B
 Julia Kova & Stacks
 Serebro
 Mumiy Troll
 Yulia Savicheva
 Ligalize
 VIA GRA
 A'Studio
 MakSim
 Blestyashchie
 BAND`EROS
 Chelsea
 Tokio

2008

Award winners
 Artist of the Year: Sergey Lazarev
 Video of the Year: Dima Bilan - Number one fan directed by Trudy Bellinger
 Best Male Act: Dima Bilan
 Best Female Act: MakSim
 Best Group: Serebro
 Best New Act: DJ Smash/Fast Food
 Best Dance Project: Diskoteka Avariya feat. Dj Smash
 Best Hip-Hop Project: CENTR feat. Basta
 Best International Act: Jay Sean
 Best Pop Act: Dima Bilan
 Plagiarism of the Year: Zhanna Friske "Zhanna friske" / Paris Hilton "Stars Are Blind"
 Sex: Vintazh/Elena Korikova
 Network: Noganno

Since 2008, Best Rock Act prize is not awarded, because of too few rock bands in MTV Russia format.

Performances
 Serebro
 Dima Bilan
 Jay Sean
 Sergey Lazarev
 Zveri
 Timati/DJ Smash
 Nastya Zadarozhnaya
 Band'eros
 Zhanna Friske
 Noize MC
 A'Studio
 Mumiy Troll
 VIA Gra

2009 ceremony cancelled
2009 RMA was cancelled due to world economic crisis that caused financial problems to organizers. It is yet to be scheduled if the prize will be back in 2010.

2014

Special awards

Free Your Mind
 2004 — Vladimir Posner
 2005 — Valery Gazzaev
 2006 — crew of the sailfish "Kruzenshtern"

Legend MTV
 2004 — Viktor Tsoi
 2005 — Boris Grebenshchikov
 2006 — Andrei Makarevich
 2007 — Mumiy Troll
 2008 — t.A.T.u.

VH1 Award
 2006 — Alena Sviridova
 2007 — Moralny codex

See also
 MTV
 MTV Russia
 MTV Networks Europe

References

External links
 Official MTV RMA website
 Official MTV Russia website

MTV
Music video awards
Russian music awards